The piastre (Egyptian: ersh, قرش) was the currency of Egypt until 1834. It was subdivided into 40 para, each of 3 akçe.

History
The piastre was based on the Turkish kuruş, introduced while Egypt was part of the Ottoman Empire. As in Turkey, debasement lead to the piastre falling significantly in value.

In 1834, the pound, or gineih (Arabic), was introduced as the chief unit of currency, worth 100 piastre. The piastre continues in use to the present day as a subdivision of the pound. The piastre continued to circulate, with the piastre subdivided into 40 para. In 1885, the para ceased to be issued, and the piastre was divided into tenths (  'oshr el-ersh). These tenths were renamed milliemes (malleem) in 1916.

Coins
In the early 19th century, billon coins in denominations of 1 akçe, 1, 5, 10 and 20 para, and 1 qirsh were in circulation, along with gold coins denominated as ¼, ½, 1, 2 and 3 mahbub.

References

Ottoman Egypt
Economic history of Egypt
Modern obsolete currencies
Currencies of Africa
1834 disestablishments